New Buffalo is a city in Berrien County in the U.S. state of Michigan. The population was 1,883 at the time of the 2010 census and 1,708 at the 2020 census.

Geography
The city is located on Lake Michigan at the mouth of the Galien River. This forms a natural harbor, which is part of the current pleasure-boat harbor drawing summer residents and boaters.

Demographics

2010 census
As of the census of 2010, there were 1,883 people, 881 households, and 497 families living in the city. The racial makeup of the city was 93.4% White, 1.6% African American, 0.5% Native American, 0.3% Asian, 0.2% Pacific Islander, 2.6% from other races, and 1.3% from two or more races. Hispanic or Latino of any race were 4.4% of the population.

There were 881 households, of which 21.8% had children under the age of 18 living with them, 42.7% were married couples living together, 9.0% had a female householder with no husband present, 4.8% had a male householder with no wife present, and 43.6% were non-families. 38.0% of all households were made up of individuals, and 15.6% had someone living alone who was 65 years of age or older. The average household size was 2.14 and the average family size was 2.80.

The median age in the city was 48.4 years. 17.3% of residents were under the age of 18; 7% were between the ages of 18 and 24; 19.4% were from 25 to 44; 34.9% were from 45 to 64; and 21.3% were 65 years of age or older. The gender makeup of the city was 49.3% male and 50.7% female.

2000 census
As of the census of 2000, there were 2,200 people, 947 households, and 603 families living in the city. The racial makeup of the city was 96.64% White, 0.41% African American, 0.23% Native American, 0.50% Asian, 0.05% Pacific Islander, 1.27% from other races, and 0.91% from two or more races. Hispanic or Latino of any race were 2.86% of the population.

There were 947 households, out of which 24.5% had children under the age of 18 living with them, 49.8% were married couples living together, 9.3% had a female householder with no husband present, and 36.3% were non-families. 30.8% of all households were made up of individuals, and 13.4% had someone living alone who was 65 years of age or older. The average household size was 2.32 and the average family size was 2.89.

In the city, the population was spread out, with 20.8% under the age of 18, 8.3% from 18 to 24, 25.2% from 25 to 44, 27.0% from 45 to 64, and 18.7% who were 65 years of age or older. The median age was 42 years. For every 100 females, there were 98.4 males. For every 100 females age 18 and over, there were 96.4 males.

The median income for a household in the city was $41,658, and the median income for a family was $52,639. Males had a median income of $35,076 versus $22,227 for females. The per capita income for the city was $24,440. About 4.3% of families and 6.2% of the population were below the poverty line, including 9.0% of those under age 18 and 4.3% of those age 65 or over.

Economy

New Buffalo is a popular resort town due to its location along the Lake Michigan shoreline and its proximity to the Chicago Metropolitan Area. As a result, tourism is the primary industry.

Four Winds Casino Resort New Buffalo opened on August 2, 2007, and brought more than 2,000 jobs to the New Buffalo area. The casino includes over 3,000 slot machines and 100 gaming tables. The Four Winds is the main competition for the Blue Chip Casino in Michigan City, Indiana.

Transportation 
CSX Transportation provides freight service to the city.

US 12 and I-94 provide freeway access to Detroit and Chicago.

A harbor, both natural and man made, is present at the mouth of the Galien River. This harbor is used by pleasure boats and is accessible to all Lake Michigan ports and beyond, but has little to no commercial traffic other than the occasional charter sailboat.

Education
The New Buffalo Area Schools system is composed of an elementary school, and a joined middle/high school. The New Buffalo Middle/High School, located off of Clay Street, was built in 2001. It has a performing arts center, multiple computer labs, indoor and outdoor running tracks, and is designed symmetrically for the middle and high school sections. The elementary school's gym was also rebuilt.

The middle/high school also has a "Smart Lab", one of the most sophisticated student labs in the country. At the smart lab, students from New Buffalo and neighboring municipalities have access to EKG machines, flight simulators, and video production equipment. In addition, an addition to the Athletic Wing was completed in 2010 with a brand new two-story weight room and auxiliary gymnasium.

The New Buffalo High School Bison compete in the BCS Conference in sports. The 1963 Boys Basketball team won the Class C State title, boys baseball won the Class D State title in 1983 and 1995. The 1999 boys cross country team won the Class D State title, and the 2005 baseball team won the Division IV State title.

Notable people
Roger Brown, Chicago painter
Laurent Novikoff, ballet master

References

External links
New Buffalo - Harbor Country Chamber
City of New Buffalo, MI Official Website
New Buffalo Business Association
New Buffalo Alumni
New Buffalo Railroad Museum

 
Michigan populated places on Lake Michigan
Cities in Berrien County, Michigan